Lyok is a rural locality (a settlement) in Kordonskoye Rural Settlement, Kishertsky District, Perm Krai, Russia. The population was 197 as of 2010. There are 9 streets.

Geography 
Lyok is located on the Lek River, 25 km southeast of Ust-Kishert (the district's administrative centre) by road. Zhenevo is the nearest rural locality.

References 

Rural localities in Kishertsky District